Mohammadabad-e Alizadeh (also Romanized as Moḩammadābād-e ‘Alīzādeh) is a village in Bahadoran Rural District, in the Central District of Mehriz County, Yazd Province, Iran. At the 2006 census, its population was 16, in 4 families.

References 

Populated places in Mehriz County